Ferdous Zaman Mukul is a Bangladesh Awami League politician and the former Member of Parliament of Bogra-5.

Career
Mukul was elected to parliament from Bogra-5 as a Bangladesh Awami League candidate in 1986.

Death
Mukul died on 4 November 2012 in Bogra District, Bangladesh.

References

Awami League politicians
Living people
3rd Jatiya Sangsad members
Year of birth missing (living people)